A student teacher or prac teacher (practice teacher) is a college, university or graduate student who is teaching under the supervision of a certified teacher in order to qualify for a degree in education.

The term is also often used interchangeably with pre-service teacher. It is a much broader term to include those students that are studying the required coursework in pedagogy, as well as their specialty, but have not entered the supervised teaching portion of their training. In many institutions pre-service teacher is the official and preferred title for all education students.

Student teaching is required for most teaching credentials.

See also 
 Certified teacher
 College of Education
 Education Specialist
 Monitorial System
 Postgraduate Certificate in Education (United Kingdom)
 Postgraduate Diploma in Education
 Pre-service teacher education
 Professional Graduate Certificate in Education (United Kingdom)
 Teacher education
 Teacher training college

References

Bibliography 
 Meyer-Botnarescue, H. and Machado, J. (2004) Student Teaching: Early Childhood Practicum Guide. Thomson Delmar Learning.
 Grim, P.R. and Michaelis, J.U. (1953) The Student Teacher in the Secondary School. Prentice-Hall.
 DellaValle, J. and Sawyer, E. (1998) Teacher Career Starter: The Road to a Rewarding Career. Career Starters.
 Wiggins, S.P. (1958) The Student Teacher in Action. Allyn and Bacon Publishers.

External links 
 "Student Teacher Survival Guide", from the National Education Association
 "Make It Happen: A Student's Guide"

Teaching
Beginners and newcomers